The 2019 Asia Rugby Championship is the fifth annual rugby union series for the top-level Asia Rugby nations. Hong Kong, South Korea and Malaysia shall compete in the 2019 series. The Asia Rugby Championship in 2019 does not include Japan who is hosting the 2019 Rugby World Cup. Other Asian nations played in the lower division tournaments.

The format of the tri-nations series is a double round-robin where the three teams play each other twice on a home and away basis. The team finishing on top of the standings at the end of the series is declared the winner.

Teams
The teams involved, with their world rankings prior to the 2019 tournament in brackets:

Standings

Fixtures
Source: asiarugby.com

Week 1

Week 2

Week 3

Week 4

Week 5

Week 6

References

2019 in Asian rugby union
2019 rugby union tournaments for national teams
2019
International rugby union competitions hosted by Hong Kong
International rugby union competitions hosted by South Korea
International rugby union competitions hosted by Malaysia
rugby union
rugby union
Asia Rugby Championship
Asia Rugby Championship
Asia Rugby Championship
Asia Rugby Championship
2019 in Malaysian sport